Riverside High School  is a public high school in Greer, South Carolina. Riverside High School was founded in 1973.

History 
The school opened in the fall of 1973 with 650 students on a  campus. Riverside was named the 1998 Palmetto's Finest High School.

In Fall 2006, students began attending a brand new building on the same premises.

The school has had a total of five principals: John Durr, Wayne Rhodes, Charles "Bob" Bayne, Andrew "Andy" Crowley, and, currently, Darah Huffman.

Athletics 
Riverside moved from Class AAA to Class AAAA following the 2009–2010 school year.
Riverside then jumped to Class 5-A for the 2016–2017 school year.

State championships 

 Baseball: 1980, 1986, 1999, 2003, 2004, 2006
 Basketball - Boys: 1984, 1985, 1988
 Cross Country - Boys: 1987, 1988, 1989, 1990, 1991, 1992, 1993, 1994, 1995, 1996, 1997, 2014, 2016
 Cross Country - Girls: 1995, 1996, 1997, 1998, 2001, 2013, 2014, 2015, 2016, 2017
 Golf - Boys: 1999, 2000
 Golf - Girls: 2007, 2008
 Lacrosse - Girls: 2021
 Soccer - Boys: 1987, 1989, 1990, 1991, 1992, 1993, 1994, 1995, 2000, 2001, 2006, 2008, 2010, 2012, 2021, 2022
 Soccer - Girls: 1991, 1992, 1993, 1994, 1995, 1996, 1997, 1999, 2001, 2004, 2006, 2009, 2010
 Softball: 1995, 1996, 1997
 Swimming - Boys: 2004, 2008, 2009, 2013, 2014, 2015, 2016
 Swimming - Girls: 2001, 2002, 2003, 2004, 2005, 2006, 2007, 2009, 2013, 2014, 2015, 2016
 Tennis - Boys: 1983, 1990, 1992
 Tennis - Girls: 1999
 Track - Boys: 1986, 1988, 1991

Notable alumni 

 Brandon Bennett (1991)  NFL running back
 Kevin Dodd (2011)  NFL defensive end
 Bill Haas (2000)  professional golfer
 Jon Kirksey (1989)  NFL defensive tackle
 Michael Roth (2008)  former MLB pitcher, college baseball pitcher at the University of South Carolina and two-time NCAA champion
 Tremayne Stephens (1994)  NFL running back

External links 
 Greenville County, South Carolina school profile.

References 

Public high schools in South Carolina
Schools in Greenville County, South Carolina
Educational institutions established in 1973
1973 establishments in South Carolina